Guthrie Township may refer to the following townships in the United States:

 Guthrie Township, Lawrence County, Indiana
 Guthrie Township, Hubbard County, Minnesota
 Guthrie Township, Callaway County, Missouri